is a Japanese manga artist who wrote and illustrated Haruka: Beyond the Stream of Time, a manga series based on the video game of the same name, of which Mizuno had worked on the character design. Haruka was serialized in LaLa DX from 1999 to 2010, and had an English serialization in Shojo Beat magazine. Hakusensha published Haruka in 17 volumes, while the English translation was pushed by Viz Media. The series was also adapted into an anime television series and a feature anime film. She has worked on several other Haruka installments.

Works

Manga

Video games

References

External links
 Tohko Mizuno at Hakusensha 
 

Manga artists from Tokushima Prefecture
Living people
Year of birth missing (living people)